Metzen is a surname. Notable people with the surname include:

James Metzen (1943–2016), American politician and businessman
Chris Metzen (born 1973), American artist, author, and game designer